

Life sciences
 In Italy, Bartolomeo Eustachi completes his , presenting his discoveries on the structure of the inner ear (including the Eustachian tube) and heart, although it will not be published until 1714.
 Cornelius Gemma publishes the first illustration of a human tapeworm.
 Thierry de Héry publishes , the first work in French on syphilis.
 Ambroise Paré appointed royal surgeon to the House of Valois in France; and begins publication of a treatise on battlefield medicine, .
 The Libellus de Medicinalibus Indorum Herbis ("Little Book of the Medicinal Herbs of the Indians") is composed in Nahuatl by Martín de la Cruz and translated into Latin by Juan Badiano at the Real Colegio de Santa Cruz in Tlatelolco (Mexico).

Births
 February 28 – Jost Bürgi, Swiss clockmaker and mathematician (died 1632)
 Petrus Plancius, Flemish cartographer and cosmographer (died 1622)

Deaths
 April 21 – Petrus Apianus, German cartographer and cosmographer (born 1495)
 May 18 – Theodor Dorsten, German botanist and physician (born 1492)
 May 26 – Sebastian Münster, German cartographer and cosmographer (born 1488)
 Bartolomeo Maggi, Bolognese surgeon, (born 1477)

References

Tortitas de Avena

 
16th century in science
1550s in science